Villi Hermann (born 1941) is a Swiss film director and screenwriter. His 1981 film The Homeless One was entered into the 13th Moscow International Film Festival. His 1989 film Bankomatt - with actor Bruno Ganz in the leading role - was entered into the 39th Berlin International Film Festival.

Selected filmography
 The Homeless One (1981)
 Bankomatt (1989)

Producer
 La Bataille d'Alger, un film dans l'Histoire (2017) by Malek Bensmaïl
 La fin da la val l'è mia la fin dal mund (2018) by Peter Frei
 Cronofobia (2018) by Francesco Rizzi
 Atlas (2020) by Niccolò Castelli

References

External links

1941 births
Living people
Swiss film directors
Swiss screenwriters
Male screenwriters
Swiss film producers
People from Lucerne